Actinostola callosa is a species of sea anemones in the family Actinostolidae in the order Actiniaria. It is a deep sea species and occurs in both Pacific and Atlantic Oceans from the continental shelf to abyssal depths.

Description
The column has regularly arranged, conspicuous tubercles and there are four whorls of tentacles. The general colour of this anemone is yellowish-white.

Distribution and habitat
A. callosa is known from both the North Atlantic Ocean and the Pacific Ocean. It occurs on the East Pacific Rise, a ridge in the mid-Pacific Ocean. It occurs from the continental shelf to abyssal depths, generally in the range . It occurs on rock, sand or mud, and on shells or other objects on the seafloor.

Ecology
Some sea anemones have long slender tentacles adapted to catch plankton, but A. callosa has relatively short, stubby tentacles, heavily armed with nematocysts, enabling it to capture larger prey.

A. callosa contains about 30% lipids which are in the form of unsaturated fats and long-chain fatty acids. This is in contrast to the tropical Condylactis gigantea, which has the same proportion of lipids, but in this case the lipids are saturated. The difference is likely due to the cold-water anemone needing membrane fluidity and a readily available source of energy that is quick to mobilise at low temperatures.

References

Actinostolidae
Animals described in 1882